The 1937 Ukrainian Cup was the second season of a football knockout competition conducting by the Football Federation of the Ukrainian SSR.

However soon after the start, Ukrainian mass media started to call it the Cup competition. The tournament was conducted from 24 April to 18 May 1937.

Competition schedule

First Round

Second Round

Third Round

Quarterfinals

Semifinals

Final

Top goalscorers

See also 
 Soviet Cup
 Ukrainian Cup

Notes

References

External links 
 Information source 
 Forgotten tournaments. Ukrainian Premier League. 

1937
Cup
1937 domestic association football cups